Gaëtane Verna is a Canadian museum curator who was born in 1965 in Kinshasa in the Democratic Republic of the Congo to Haitian parents.

Biography 
Gaëtane Verna is the Wexner Center for the Arts Executive Director in Columbus, Ohio. Between 2012 and 2022 she was the General and Artistic Director of the  Power Plant Contemporary Art Gallery in Toronto, Ontario. She holds a master's degree and a Master's of Advanced Studies from the Paris 1 Panthéon Sorbonne University as well as an international heritage administration and conservation diploma from the École Nationale du Patrimoine de Paris. Gaëtane Verna has taught at the Department of Art History at Bishop's University in Sherbrooke and at the Université du Québec à Montréal.

From 1998 to 2006, she was the curator of the Foreman Gallery at Bishop's University where she organized numerous exhibitions of Canadian and international artists. She was the Executive Director and Chief Curator of the Musée d'art de Joliette from 2006 to 2012. Artists with whom she has collaborated since 1998 include Terry Adkins, John Akomfrah, Vasco Araújo, Fiona Banner, Ydessa Hendeles, Alfredo Jaar, Luis Jacob, Kimsooja, Yam Lau, Oswaldo Maciá, Javier Tellez, Denyse Thomasos, Bill Viola, Young-Hae Chang Heavy Industries and Franz Erhard Walther.

Verna is Chair of the Board of the Toronto Arts Council. She is a member of the Conseil des arts de Montréal as well as the President of the Visual Arts since 2006. In 2010, she presided over the jury of the Ozias-Leduc Prize.  In 2017, she was named Knight of the Order of Arts and Letters by the Cultural Service of the French Embassy in Canada to highlight and recognize her significant contribution to the advancement of the arts in France and around the world. She was named curator, chosing the work of Kapwani Kiwanga, of the Canadian Pavillion for the 60th Venice Biennale.

References 

Canadian women curators
Haitian Canadian